Orange Park Normal & Industrial School was an integrated school in Orange Park, Florida, funded by a Presbyterian group. Florida's only integrated school, it was founded by the American Missionary Association (AMA). It closed in the wake of laws forbidding whites from teaching blacks. William N. Sheats, who headed Florida's school system pushed for the law.

The school opened in October 1891 south of Jacksonville in Clay County along the St. Johns River. The campus included dormitories and workshops.

Amos W. Farnham was the school's principal, followed by B.D. Rowlee. The school appealed and won against "Sheats' Law" (requiring segregation even at private institutions), but closed in 1913 after Sheats returned to office and was successful in having the legislature outlaw whites teaching black students.

A historical marker is at the site of the school. The school site is home to Orange Park's town hall and police station.

References

Schools in Clay County, Florida
1891 establishments in Florida
Educational institutions established in 1891
Defunct schools in Florida